The Stade Taïeb Mhiri is a multi-purpose stadium in Sfax, Tunisia. It is currently used mostly for football matches and is the home stadium of Club Sportif Sfaxien. Built in 1938, it holds 22,000 people and was used for the 2004 African Cup of Nations.

It was named as Stade Henri Coudrec, who was one of the French notable personalities and vice-president of the municipality of Sfax, before taking the name of Taieb Mhiri, who was a Tunisian politician and the interior minister from 1956 until his death in 1965.

References

External links
Photos of Stadiums in Tunisia at cafe.daum.net/stade
Stadium description at bbc.co.uk

Buildings and structures completed in 1938
Sfax Taieb
Multi-purpose stadiums in Tunisia
Sfax
CS Sfaxien